Canthigaster marquesensis is a species of pufferfish in the family Tetraodontidae. It is known only from Nuku Hiva in the Marquesas Islands, where it is found at a depth range of 15 to 42 m (49 to 138 ft). It is a reef-associated marine species that reaches 7.1 cm (2.8 inches) SL. It feeds on algae and small invertebrates. It is known to be oviparous.

References 

marquesensis
Fish described in 1977
Fish of the Pacific Ocean